Strada statale 7 Via Appia (SS 7) is a motorway that - following the path of the Roman consular road of the same name - connects Rome to Brindisi. In the stretch from Cisterna di Latina to Terracina, the SS 7 is called "fettuccia di Terracina" due to its straight line.

History 
The SS 7 was established in 1928 with the following route: "Roma - Velletri - Terracina - Capua - Napoli - Marigliano - Avellino - Atripalda - Sant'Angelo dei Lombardi Junction - Lioni - Ruoti - Potenza - Laterza - Castellaneta - Taranto - Francavilla - Brindisi."

References 

7
Transport in Rome
Transport in Lazio
Transport in Campania
Transport in Basilicata
Transport in Apulia